is a Japanese footballer currently playing as a defender for Kataller Toyama.

Career statistics

Club
.

Notes

References

1997 births
Living people
Association football people from Gunma Prefecture
Nippon Sport Science University alumni
Japanese footballers
Association football defenders
Japan Football League players
J3 League players
Tegevajaro Miyazaki players